Abu Dhabi Country Club is a women's association football club based in Abu Dhabi, United Arab Emirates. It is a founding member of a women's association football league.

Honours 
 United Arab Emirates Women's Football League
 Champions (3): 2005, 2014–15, 2015–16

References

Women's football clubs in the United Arab Emirates
1999 establishments in the United Arab Emirates